The Seattle Studs are a semi-professional/collegiate baseball team in the greater Seattle, Washington area. They are currently a member of the National Baseball Congress in the Pacific International League and compete in the Horizon Air Summer Series. The team's motto is "Once a Stud, Always a Stud". The team is coached by Barry Aden, David Benson, and Cody Aden. They are advised by Elisa Thomases and Stephen Potter.

Franchise history
The Seattle Cheney Studs are one of the oldest amateur baseball organizations in the country. The Studs were founded 67 years ago in 1954 by Ben Cheney of Cheney Lumber Company in Tacoma, Washington, as the Cheney Studs. The “Studs” nickname is derived from Cheney's company that copyrighted the 2 x 4 for building homes and structures. The team has been active for 64 consecutive years, most under the banner of the Seattle Studs, but also the Cheney Studs, Performance Radiator Studs, and Swannie's Studs.
The Studs have traditionally consisted of a combination of current and former college players, and former professionals. In the last few seasons, the team has begun to consist of a greater percentage of college players than former professionals.

The Studs earned their first trip to the National Baseball Congress World Series in 1989 (0-2), with subsequent appearances in 1992 (T-5th), 1993 (T-11th), and 1994 (T-11th).  They have attended the NBC every year since 2002, finishing in the top ten thirteen times, and finishing first runner up in 2008, 2010, 2012 and 2014. They won the NBC World Series for the first time in 2013 a second time in 2015 and a third title in 2019. They won the Horizon Air Summer Series in 2008, 2009,2010 and 2012. The Studs also compete in the Grand Forks International every year, winning the tournament in 2001, 2010, 2015, 2016 and 2017.  The Studs play annually in Kamloops, British Columbia in the Kamloops International Baseball Tournament, winning the tournament 10 out of the last 14 years. The Kamloops tournament was not played in 2013.

Home field
In 2002, the Seattle Studs began using the University of Puget Sound in Tacoma, WA, as their home ballpark during the summers. In the summer of 2008, the Studs began to split their home games between the University of Puget Sound and Steve Cox Memorial Stadium in the White Center area of Seattle, Washington. In summer 2011, the University of Puget Sound's baseball field was renovated, and the Studs played their home games at the Heidelberg Field Complex in Tacoma. In summer 2011, the team also played 12 games at Maguinez Field, named after Bob Maguinez, a former Cheney Studs player from the 1950s.

Rivals
The Seattle Studs' main rival in the Pacific Northwest is the Everett Merchants semi-professional baseball team. These two franchises have competed for over 24 years in the Pacific International League and many of the major tournaments in the Northwest. The Studs have dominated this rivalry over the past ten years, perpetually winning the Pacific International League. The Studs often recruit the Merchants' best players for the National Baseball Congress World Series in August. The Studs also defeated the Merchants in the final of the 2015 Grand Forks International, winning the tournament.

The Studs have recently started an annual rivalry with the Humboldt Crabs, a semi-professional team located in Arcata, California. The Studs have played the Crabs on their annual California road trip the last seven summers.

Coaches
Barry Aden, a member of the National Baseball Congress Hall of Fame, the Grand Forks Tournament Hall of Fame, the National Semi Pro Baseball Hall of Fame and the Centralia College Sports Hall of Fame, is the General Manager and Head Coach of the Seattle Cheney Studs. In over 30 years of coaching, Aden has compiled a record of 1128 wins, 445 losses and 6 ties. He has led the Studs to the NBC World Series 22 times, and to a top 10 finish 13 times, finishing first runner up in 2008, 2010, 2012 and 2014. He also led the Studs to their first ever NBC World Series National Championship in 2013, their second National Championship in 2015 and their 3rd National title in 2019. Aden was awarded manager of the year for the team's first-place finish in 2013 and again in 2019.

Former coaches: 
Barry Aden	2001-
Mark Dow	1998-2000
Dan Dow	1995-1997
Jeff Scanlan	1994
Barry Aden	1990-1993
Steve Quealey	1990
Dave "Scooter" Ellis	1990
Ken Knutson	1988-1989
Dave Pascho	1986-1987
Jim Riley	1985
Greg McCollum	1981-1984
Larry Book	1980
Fred Shull	1976-1979
Tom Kallas	1975
Paul Tomlinson	1973-1974
George Grant	1966-1972
Ed O'Brien	1961-1965
Doug McArthur	1957
Joe Budnick	1954-1960

Notable alumni
Tim Lincecum
Brent Lillibridge

NBC All-Americans
Jonas Kim, DH (2021)
Charlie Larson, 3rd Base (2021)
Henry Cheney, Outfielder (MVP 2019)
Kyle Strash, Infielder (2019)
Zander Clouse, Pitcher (2019)
Jack Pauley, DH (2019)
Brock Gagliardi Catcher (2019)
Garrett Breda, Catcher (2018, 2012)
Landon Riker, Outfielder (2017)
Connor Savage, Outfielder (2015, MVP 2015)
Geoff Brown, Pitcher (2015)
Scott Kuzminsky, Pitcher (2014,2011)
Taylor Thompson, Pitcher (2014,2013,2010,2008) *Inducted into the NBC Hall of Fame (2016)
Eric Peterson, DH (2013)
David Benson, Pitcher (2012, MVP 2013)
Bobby Tannehill, Utility (2012)
Brady Steiger, DH (2012)
Derek Jennings, Shortstop (2010,2008)
Brandon Kuykendall, Outfield (2008)
Nick Cebula, Pitcher (2007,2005)
Andre Marshall, Outfield (2006)
Dan Dimascio, Utility (1992)
Rich Mialovich, Thirdbase (1992)
JT Zink Pitcher (2008-2012)

In Popular Culture

A Seattle Studs Baseball t-shirt can be seen in a location in The X-Files CD-ROM game from 1998, which was filmed and set in Seattle.

References

Sources
http://www.nbcbaseball.com/nbcteams.html

External links 
 Seattle Studs official website

1954 establishments in Washington (state)
Amateur baseball teams in Washington (state)
Baseball teams established in 1954
Baseball in Seattle